The Claise is a  long river in west-central France located in the departments of Indre and Indre-et-Loire (Centre-Val de Loire). It is a tributary of the river Creuse on the right side, and so is a sub-tributary of the Loire by Creuse and Vienne. It flows into the Creuse near Abilly.

References

Rivers of France
Rivers of Indre
Rivers of Indre-et-Loire
Rivers of Centre-Val de Loire